Thomas Smith Sinclair (1880 – 1968) was a Scottish footballer who played as a goalkeeper at the start of the 20th century.

Career 
Sinclair began his career with Rutherglen Glencairn, winning the Scottish Junior Cup and Glasgow Junior League in 1902 alongside future Scotland internationals Jimmy McMenemy and Alec Bennett. He then joined Morton.

He joined Rangers in 1904 and played there for nearly three seasons. He spent much of his time at Ibrox as a reserve, but eventually made 73 first-team appearances. He played in the 1905 Scottish Cup Final and in the Scottish Football League championship play-off match of the same year, but finished on the losing side in both.

He also spent several weeks on loan at Celtic in 1906. At the start of the 1906–07 season, the Celtic goalkeeper Davey Adams cut his hand during a benefit match at Ibrox – the injury was caused by a nail which had been inserted through a goal-post for a five-a-side tournament – and as a gesture of goodwill, Rangers loaned Sinclair (who had lost his starting place to Alex Newbigging) to Celtic whilst Adams recovered from injury, and this is the first known transfer between the two Old Firm clubs. Sinclair played six league fixtures and three Glasgow Cup ties for Celtic, keeping clean sheets in every match bar his final game, where Celtic won 3–2 in the Glasgow Cup final.

He joined Newcastle United in 1907. Again, he was used mainly as a reserve and made only eight first-team appearances in five years on Tyneside. In these games he kept three clean sheets, conceded three goals and lost only one match. During Sinclair's spell at Newcastle the club won the English First Division twice and the FA Cup once (as well as reaching two further finals), but he was unable to displace fellow Glaswegian Jimmy Lawrence (the Magpies''' all-time record appearance record holder) for long enough to claim any medals.

He later returned to Scotland and played for clubs including Dunfermline Athletic and Kilmarnock, but again was never the first choice in his position.(Kilmarnock player) Sinclair,?, FitbaStats

 Personal life 
Sinclair served in the British Army during the First World War.

Honours
Rutherglen Glencairn
 Scottish Junior Cup: 1901–02

Rangers
Scottish Cup: Runner-up: 1904–05
Glasgow Merchants Charity Cup: 1905–06

Celtic
Glasgow Cup: 1906–07

See also
Played for Celtic and Rangers

 References Celtic: A complete record 1888–1992'' by Paul Lunney

External links
 Toon 1892: Player Profile – Tom Sinclair

1880 births
1968 deaths
Footballers from Perth and Kinross
Association football goalkeepers
Rutherglen Glencairn F.C. players
Rangers F.C. players
Celtic F.C. players
Newcastle United F.C. players
Greenock Morton F.C. players
Scottish footballers
Dumbarton Harp F.C. players
Dunfermline Athletic F.C. players
Kilmarnock F.C. players
Scottish Junior Football Association players
Scottish Football League players
English Football League players
British Army personnel of World War I